Nienhagen may refer to the following places in Germany:

Nienhagen, Mecklenburg-Vorpommern, in the district of Bad Doberan, Mecklenburg-Vorpommern (also home of Nienhagen Wood)
Nienhagen, Lower Saxony, in the district of Celle, Lower Saxony 
Nienhagen, Saxony-Anhalt, in the district of Harz, Saxony-Anhalt 
, a part of Staufenberg, Lower Saxony 
Detmold-Nienhagen, a part of Detmold, North Rhine-Westphalia